Union City is a city in the northern part of Hudson County, in the U.S. state of New Jersey. As of the 2020 United States census, the city was the state's 18th-most-populous municipality, with a population of 68,589, an increase of 2,134 (+3.2%) from the 2010 census count of 66,455. As of the 2010 Census, among cities with a population of more than 50,000, it was the most densely populated city in the United States, with a density of 54,138 per square mile of land. The Census Bureau's Population Estimates Program calculated that the city's population was 65,638 in 2021, ranking the city the 580th-most-populous in the country.

Union City was incorporated as a city by an act of the New Jersey Legislature on June 1, 1925, with the merger of Union Hill and West Hoboken Township. The city's name references the merger of those two municipalities.

Two major waves of immigration, first of German speakers and then of Spanish speakers, greatly influenced the development and character of Union City. Its two nicknames, "Embroidery Capital of the United States" and "Havana on the Hudson", reflect important aspects of that history. Thousands visit Union City each year to see the nation's longest-running passion play. 

Union City is where Mallomars were first sold and the site of the first lunch wagon, built by Jerry and Daniel O'Mahoney and John Hanf, which helped spark New Jersey's golden age of diner manufacturing, for which the state is colloquially referred to by author Richard J.S. Gutman as the "diner capital of the world".

History

Early history and civic boundaries

The area of what is today Union City was originally inhabited by the Munsee-speaking branch of Lenape Native Americans, who wandered into the vast woodland area encountered by Henry Hudson during the voyages he conducted from 1609 to 1610 for the Dutch, who later claimed the area (which included the future New York City) and named it New Netherland. The portion of that land that included the future Hudson County was purchased from members of the Hackensack tribe of the Lenni-Lenape and became part of Pavonia, New Netherland.

The relationship between the early Dutch settlers and Native Americans was marked by frequent armed conflict over land claims. In 1658 by New Netherland colony Director-General Peter Stuyvesant re-purchased the territory. The boundaries of the purchase are described in the deed preserved in the New York State Archives, as well as the medium of exchange: "80 fathoms of wampum, 20 fathoms of cloth, 12 brass kettles, 6 guns, one double brass kettle, 2 blankets, and one half barrel of strong beer." In 1660, he ordered the building of a fortified village at Bergen to protect the area. It was the first permanent European settlement in New Jersey, located in what is now the Journal Square area of Jersey City near Academy Street. In 1664, the British captured New Netherland from the Dutch, at which point the boundaries of Bergen Township encompassed what is now known as Hudson County. North of this was the unpopulated Bergen Woods, which would later be claimed by settlers, after whom a number of Union City streets today are named, including Sipp Street, Brown Street, Golden Lane, Tournade Street and Kerrigan Avenue, which is named after J. Kerrigan, the owner of Kerrigan Farm, who donated the land for Saint Michael's Monastery.

The area that would one day be Union City, however, remained sparsely populated until the early 19th century. The British granted Bergen a new town charter in 1668. In 1682 they created Bergen County, which was named to honor their Dutch predecessors. That county comprised all of present-day Hudson, Bergen and Passaic counties. Sparsely inhabited during the 17th and 18th centuries, the southeast section of Bergen County had grown by the early 19th century to the point where it was deemed necessary to designate it a separate county. The New Jersey legislature created Hudson County in 1840, and in 1843, it was divided into two townships: Old Bergen Township (which eventually became Jersey City) and North Bergen Township, which was gradually separated into Hudson County's present day municipalities: Hoboken in 1849, Weehawken and Guttenberg in 1859, and West Hoboken and Union Township. West Hoboken was incorporated as a township by an act of the New Jersey Legislature on February 28, 1861, from portions of North Bergen Township. The township was reincorporated on April 6, 1871, and again on March 27, 1874. Portions of the township were ceded to Weehawken in 1879. On June 28, 1884, West Hoboken was reincorporated as a town, based on an ordinance passed nine days earlier. The town was reincorporated on April 24, 1888, based on the results of a referendum passed 12 days earlier. Union Township, or simply Union, was formed in 1864 through the merger of a number of villages, such as Dalleytown, Buck's Corners and Cox's Corners. The largest of these villages, Union Hill, became the colloquial name for the merged town of Union itself. The northern section of Union Township was later incorporated as West New York in 1898. Union City was incorporated on June 1, 1925, by merging the two towns of West Hoboken and Union Hill. The name of one of the city's schools, Union Hill Middle School, recalls the former town.

Immigration and industry

In the 18th century, Dutch and English merchants first settled the area. Later, German immigrants immigrated from Manhattan. Irish, Polish, Armenians, Syrians, Eastern European Jews and Italians followed. In 1851, Germans moved across the Hudson River from New York City in search of affordable land and open space.  During the American Civil War a military installation, Camp Yates, covered an area now bounded by Bergenline and Palisade Avenues from 22nd to 32nd Street. Germans began to settle what would become Union Hill in 1851, and some descendants of the immigrants of this period live in the city today. Although the area's diversity was represented by the more than 19 nationalities that made their home in the Dardanelles (a five-block area of Central Avenue from 23rd Street to 27th Street) from the mid-19th century to the early 20th century, German Americans and Dutch dominated the area. Along with Swiss and Austrian immigrants, they founded the European-style lace making industries for which they were famous. The introduction of Schiffli lace machines in Hudson County made Union City the "embroidery capital of the United States". The trademark of that industry is on the Union City Seal, though foreign competition and austere prevailing fashions led to the decline of embroidery and other industries in the area by the late 1990s. In May 2014 the city dedicated "Embroidery Square" at New York Avenue to commemorate that history.

As immigration to the area progressed throughout the 19th and 20th centuries, Belgians, Armenians, Greeks, Chinese, Jews and Russians found a home in the area, though its domination by Germans by the turn of the 20th century was reflected in the fact that the minutes of town meetings were recorded in German. By this time, the area was witnessing a period of urbanization, as an extensive trolley system was developed by the North Hudson County Railway, spurred by both electrification in 1890 and the arrival of Irish and Italian immigrants, which dominated the city until the late 1960s. Successive waves of immigrants from Eastern Europe, the Near East and Latin America contributed to the embroidery industry in subsequent years. "The Cultural Thread"/"El Hilo", an exhibit highlighting this industry, is on display at Union City's Park Performing Arts Center.

The town was famous for being the home of the rowdy Hudson Burlesque. Theaters in Union City featured vaudeville and burlesque and acts including Fred Astaire and Harry Houdini. It was at a vaudeville theater in Union City that comedian George Burns would meet his longtime partner and wife, Gracie Allen. Union City was also for a time the home to the headquarters of sports publisher Joe Weider.

The first Cubans immigrated to Union City from New York City in the late 1940s, having been attracted to the city in search of work after hearing of its famed embroidery factories. A majority of these Cubans hailed from small towns or cities, particularly Villa Clara Province in central Cuba. After World War II, veterans relocated to Bergen County, causing a short-lived decline in the population. By the 1960s the city was predominantly an old-line Italian enclave. This began to change when large numbers of Cubans emigrated to the city after Fidel Castro took power in 1962. This made Union City for many years the city with the largest Cuban population in the U.S. after Miami, hence its nickname, "Little Havana on the Hudson." Following the Mariel boatlift in 1980, 10,000 Cubans settled in New Jersey, leading to a second wave of Cubans to Union City, which totaled 15,000 by 1994. The city, as well as neighboring towns such as West New York, experienced a profound cultural impact as a result of this, as seen in such aspects of local culture as its cuisine, fashion, music, entertainment and cigar-making.

Amid a redevelopment boom in the early 1960s, The Troy Towers, a 22-story twin tower luxury apartment complex, was completed in 1966 on the edge of the Palisades cliffs on Mountain Road at 19th Street, at the former site of the Abbey Inn, just north of where a motorized vehicle elevator and a staircase called the Lossburg Steps were located. The former was an angled ramp originally built for horse-drawn carriages, which along with the steps, connected to Hackensack Plank Road beneath the cliffs, in the Shades section of Weehawken. According to the Hudson County Multiple Listing service, between 2016 and 2018 the median list price of residential properties on the market in Union City fluctuated between $345,000 and $509,000. The most expensive home on the market in May 2018 was a four-family building on sale for $1.6 million, while the lowest was a studio apartment in Troy Towers for $148,000. A typical residential property was a six-bedroom, three-family house in need of updating, listed at $568,000.

Development in the 21st century

Since its inception in 2000, the Cuban Day Parade of New Jersey became a major annual event in North Hudson, beginning in North Bergen and traveling south to its end in Union City. Union City has historically been a family-oriented city predominantly made up of brownstones, two-family homes and locally owned businesses. Another wave of modestly sized residences began development approximately in 2003, spurred by similar development in neighboring Hoboken, and the city's attempt to attract developers to what had historically been a town unfriendly to them, according to Mayor Brian P. Stack. Through approval of varied construction projects to address the needs of residents of different incomes, improved rent control laws and community input on such issues, this "Hobokenization" resulted in positive comparisons with the redeveloped Hoboken of the mid-to-late 1990s, with new restaurants, bars, and art galleries cited as evidence of renewal. The city recorded $192 million in new construction in 2007, and 600 certificates of occupancy, with 500–700 projected for 2008–2009, compared with previous years, in which 50 certificates was considered a high amount. This development continued for several years, reaching a milestone in 2008 with the completion of Union City's first high-rise condominium tower, The Thread, whose name evokes the city's historical association with the embroidery industry. Other such buildings followed, such as the Altessa, Park City Grand, and Hoboken Heights. In 2015, the AARP ranked Union City #6 on its list of the best small cities to live in.

Geography
According to the United States Census Bureau, the city had a total area of 1.29 square miles (3.33 km2), all of which was land. Part of the New York metropolitan area, it is one of the municipalities which comprise North Hudson. Located atop the ridge of the lower Hudson Palisades (just south of the highest point in the county), many of its streets offer glimpses and views of the surrounding municipalities, the New York City skyline, and the New Jersey Meadowlands.

The city is bisected by New Jersey Route 495, a vehicular cut built in conjunction with the Lincoln Tunnel. Soon after its construction, many street names were abandoned in favor of numbering in most of North Hudson starting at 2nd Street, just north of Paterson Plank Road, which runs through the city's only major park and creates its border with Jersey City. 49th Street is the northern boundary with West New York. Apart from a small section between Bergen Turnpike and Weehawken Cemetery, Kennedy Boulevard, a major north–south thoroughfare, creates the western border with North Bergen. A former colonial road and previous border between the merged municipalities takes three names as it diagonally crosses the city's urban grid: Hackensack Plank Road, 32nd Street, and Bergen Turnpike. Most of the city north of the street, formerly Union Hill, shares its eastern border along Park Avenue with Weehawken. The southern section of the city, formerly West Hoboken, is indeed west of Hoboken, which it overlooks and is connected by the road which creates their shared border, the Wing Viaduct.

The city borders the Hudson County municipalities of Hoboken, Jersey City, North Bergen, Weehawken and West New York.

Unincorporated communities, localities and place names located partially or completely within the city include Union Hill and West Hoboken.

Demographics

20th century
According to the 1910 United States census, the population of West Hoboken and Union Hill, the two towns that would later merge to form Union City was 37,000 and 23,000, respectively.

By the late 20th century, Union City emerged as a working class community. One of Hudson County's three homeless shelters, Palisades Emergency Residence Corp. (PERC), is located in Union City. The PERC facility, which includes a soup kitchen, food pantry and 40-bed shelter on 37th Street, lost $100,000 in federal funding in 2011, and in January and August 2012, aided a record-breaking number of guests.

2000 Census
According to the 2000 United States Census, Union City had a population of 67,088, making it the second-most populous municipality in the county after Jersey City.

The population density was 52,977.8 inhabitants per square mile (20,395.9/km2) in 2000, approximately twice as high as New York City as a whole, but less than Manhattan alone. Union City is the most densely populated city in the United States, though neighboring Guttenberg (legally incorporated as a town) was more densely populated. In 2000, the median age was 32 years. For every 100 females, there were 100.6 males. For every 100 females age 18 and over, there were 98.8 males.

As of the 2000 Census, 58.7% of the population was foreign born and 21.6% of residents were naturalized citizens, while 13.9% only speak English at home, whereas 80.7% reported that they spoke Spanish at home.

2010 Census
Union City's 2010 population of 66,455 made it the state's 17th largest municipality, having seen a decline of 633 residents (-0.9%) from its population of 67,088 in the 2000 Census, when it was the state's 16th most populous municipality. , it was still the country's second-most densely populated incorporated municipality (after the nearby Town of Guttenberg) and the most densely populated U.S. city.

The Census Bureau's 2006–2010 American Community Survey showed that (in 2010 inflation-adjusted dollars) median household income was $40,173 (with a margin of error of +/− $1,946) and the median family income was $43,101 (+/− $2,185). Males had a median income of $31,987 (+/− $1,696) versus $25,010 (+/− $1,517) for females. The per capita income for the city was $18,506 (+/− $719). About 17.0% of families and 20.0% of the population were below the poverty line, including 29.4% of those under age 18 and 20.8% of those age 65 or over.

Hispanics remained the dominant ethnic group in the city, and their percentage of the population increased from 82.3% in the 2000 Census to 84.7% in the 2010 Census. Non-Hispanic whites made up 15.3% of the city's population in 2010; up from 13.3% in the 2000 Census. Blacks made up 5.2% of the city's population in 2010; up from 3.3% in the 2000 Census. The rest of the racial makeup of the city was 0.70% Native American, 2.15% Asian, 0.08% Pacific Islander, 28.19% from other races, and 6.87% from two or more races. Though Native Americans comprise less than 1% of the city's population, they doubled between the 2000 and 2010 Census, and combined with West New York's Native Americans, comprise 38% of the county's Native American population. Spanish was spoken at home by more than half of the residents of Union City, according to U.S. Census Bureau data released in 2017.

Demographics in the 2010s and 2020s
As of May 2017, the age breakdown of the city was as follows: 22.5% of residents were under the age of 18, of which 6.6% were under the age of five; and 10.9% who were 65 years of age or older. In 2019, the median age was 37.8 years.

As of July 2019, Union City's employment breakdown was:
7.8% Construction;
9.6% Manufacturing;
4.4% Wholesale trade;
12.3% Retail;
9.4% Transportation and warehousing;
0.4% Utilities;
1.8% Information;
3.7% Finance and insurance;
2.1% Real estate, rental, leasing;
4.1% Professional, scientific, technical services;
8.2% Administrative, support, waste management;
5.2% Educational services;
10.1% Health care and social assistance;
2.1% Arts, entertainment, recreation;
11.0% Accommodation, food services; 
5.7$ Other services;
and 2.1% Public administration.

As of July 2019, 71.5% of residents age 25 or older had completed high school or a higher level of education, and 21.6% had a Bachelor's degree or higher degree of education. As of the 2000 Census, 17% of the city's employed residents work in New York City.

Of Union City's 24,931 housing units in 2010 (up 1,190 from the 2000 Census), 2,117 of them, or 8%, were vacant, twice the vacancy rate of the 2000 Census.

As of May 2017, the average income of a Union City resident was $19,834 a year, and the compared to a national average of $28,555 a year. The median household income of a Union City resident is $40,939 a year, compared to the national median of is $53,482. By July 2019, the median household income was $48,992.

In the 2000s, the Brookings Institution studies ranked Union City among the 92 most economically depressed localities in the United States, with 18.1% of the population and 27.5% of the children falling below the poverty line. In 1997, the New Jersey Municipal Distress Index, which is based on social, economic, fiscal and physical indicators, ranked Union City as the third most distressed community in the state. By July 2019, 19.6% of residents lived in poverty.

The Latino and Hispanic community

Immigration from Cuba to Union City began slowly in the late 1940s and early 1950s, when jobs in the local embroidery and textile factories were abundant. By 1955, the city's Cuban population was large enough that Fidel Castro visited Union City to raise money for his revolt against Cuban dictator Fulgencio Batista, though a speech he gave one night at a bar on 26th Street, Le Molino Rojo ("The Red Mill") led to a brawl that resulted in Castro's arrest. Following the Cuban Revolution of 1959, large numbers of Cubans in professional occupations emigrated to Union City, resulting in Union City's status as the nation's second-largest Cuban population, behind Miami, Florida, leading to the nickname "Little Havana on the Hudson". Aspects of the enclave are explored in the 2009 publication The Cubans of Union City: Immigrants and Exiles in a New Jersey Community. In the ensuing decades, Cuban residents spread out to other communities of North Hudson County. West New York, at 19.64%, now has the highest percentage of Cubans in New Jersey, with Union City in second place, with 15.35%. These two municipalities have the highest Cuban population percentage in the United States outside of Florida. Moreover, Union City still boasts the largest Hispanic population percentage in New Jersey, at 84.7% by the 2010 Census. By the early 2000s Union City had become a mix of the Latin and Asian diasporas, with Dominicans cited as the fastest-growing ethnic group, and other groups including Colombians, Ecuadoreans and Salvadorans. Despite the decline in the size of the Cuban population, the major New York City television news outlets will often journey to Union City to interview citizens when developments in Cuba–United States relations occur. As of the 2000 Census, 5.94% of Union City's residents identified themselves as being of Ecuadorian ancestry, which was the third highest of any municipality in New Jersey and the seventh highest percentage of Ecuadorian people in any place in the United States with 1,000 or more residents identifying their ancestry. That number increased to 12.6%, according to December 2017 Census figures.

Parks and recreation
The Hudson County Park System maintains Washington Park, which covers  straddling the border of the city and Jersey City Heights. The idea for the park likely originated in the late 1880s or early 1890s. The two sets of residents most instrumental in its creation were the Suckley and Allen families. The Suckleys owned the land on which the park was built for generations, which came to be called the Suckley estate. The family, however, did not pay much attention to the plot, which was just a flat expanse of dirt, and eventually came to be used to host visiting carnivals, circuses, and Wild West shows, including Buffalo Bill's Wild West show, which put on its performance there in 1908, when the plot was called the North Street Grounds. On January 12, 1909, a joint committee representing various Hudson County groups was formed to petition the relevant government agencies, such as the Hudson County freeholders, for the money needed to purchase the Suckley estate and other smaller properties that were part of the site. Assemblyman William R. Davidson argued at the committee's first meeting that the 14th Street viaduct being constructed at the time in Hoboken, which the park site overlooked, would be a significant transportation corridor, which would increase property values. The Suckley Park Association was founded that same year for the purpose of turning the plot into a park. Its co-founder and first president was doctor and civic leader Ulamor Allen, who has been called the Father of Washington Park. On June 8 that year, Allen addressed the Hudson County Park Commission to argue for the park, joining with others who lobbied for the purchase the Curries Woods site for a county park, which would later straddle the Bayonne-Jersey City border. The County Park Commission agreed that both "border line" parks deserved to be developed, though bureaucratic red tape would delay the endeavor for years. In July 1914, the Suckley Park Association asked the Park Commission to requisition the County Board of Freeholders for $500,000 for the park. The following month, the commissioners passed a resolution asking the Freeholders to borrow that money. In 1917 the county reached an agreement to purchase the land from the property owners for a total of $562,435. The park took its current shape in the 1930s, partially as a result of the input of the Works Progress Administration. 

Reservoir Park, located around Hackensack Reservoir on Palisade Avenue between 20th and 22nd Streets, opened on September 25, 2015. The passive park, at the city border in Weehawken, was created on the  site of a reservoir that had been owned by United Water but had not been used since 1996.

Commerce and economy

Originally, Bergenline Avenue was the width of a cowpath, and was not regarded as a business center. Street car tracks were expected to be laid on Palisade Avenue where the Town Hall was located. However, an influential citizen named Henry Kohlmeier, who had just built his residence on Palisade Avenue, did not wish to be disturbed by the noise of the passing cars, and proposed that the tracks be laid on Bergenline Avenue, two blocks to the west, and before those who would have objected to this became aware of this change, the motion was approved. 

The continuous line of retail stores that appeared on Bergenline Avenue by the time the town of Union Hill was incorporated made it not only the city's main commercial thoroughfare, but a major shopping thoroughfare for North Hudson County, one of the leading shopping centers and commercial strips in Northern New Jersey, and the longest commercial avenue in the state. Among the Cuban Americans in the area, it has earned the nickname La Avenida.

Bergenline runs through not only the entire length of Union City from north to south, but also through West New York, Guttenberg and North Bergen. Also known as the "Miracle Mile", Bergenline's largest concentration of retail and chain stores begins at the intersection of 32nd Street and continues north until 92nd Street in North Bergen, and while it is a narrow one-way, southbound street throughout most of Union City, it becomes a four lane, two-way street at 48th Street, one block south of the town's northern boundary. Bergenline Avenue is also used as the route for local parades, such as the annual Memorial Day Parade. 

At Union City's southern end, Bergenline is primarily a residential street, with the shopping district concentrated at Summit Avenue and Transfer Station, so called because it was a transfer point for buses and three trolley lines. The neighborhood was also the site, in 1912, of the first lunch wagon built by Jerry and Daniel O'Mahoney and John Hanf, which was bought for $800 and operated by restaurant entrepreneur Michael Griffin, who chose the location for its copious foot traffic. The wagon helped spark New Jersey's so-called "golden age of diner manufacturing", which in turn made the state the informal "diner capital of the world". In the decades that followed, nearly all major U.S. diner manufacturers, including Jerry O'Mahoney Inc., started in New Jersey. During World War II, the area was a 24-hour hotspot for U.S. servicemen, who patronized the dozens of nightclubs located there. In later decades, Summit Avenue was not as busy a shopping area as upper Bergenline, so the city implemented a series of improvements in 2009 to improve business there, such as improved sidewalks, landscaping and street lights from Seventh Street to 13th Street.

In terms of business, Union City is notable for being the location where Mallomars were first sold. Nabisco sold them to a grocer in the southern half of the town, when it was West Hoboken.

Union City is one of several cities in Hudson County that contains a state-established Urban Enterprise Zone (UEZ), under a program that was implemented in 1983 by the New Jersey Department of Commerce and Economic Development assist businesses and revitalize economically distressed communities in New Jersey. One of 32 zones covering 37 municipalities statewide, Union City was selected in 1994 as one of a group of 10 zones added to participate in the program and one of four of those chosen based on a competition. In addition to other benefits to encourage employment and investment within the UEZ, shoppers can take advantage of a reduced 3.3125% sales tax rate (half of the % rate charged statewide) at eligible merchants. Established in April 1995, the city's Urban Enterprise Zone status expires in April 2026.  There are approximately 180 UEZ-certified businesses in the city, which includes Bergenline Avenue from 49th to 15th Streets, 32nd Street from Bergenline Avenue to Kennedy Boulevard, Summit Avenue from 18th to Fifth Street, and Paterson Plank Road from Fifth to Seventh Streets. In addition to providing an incentive for shoppers and for business owners to invest in the area without raising taxes, up to $30,000 in annual UEZ revenue is also used for area upkeep and safety projects, marketing campaigns, and holiday decorations.

According to the U.S. Bureau of Labor Statistics, Union City's unemployment rate as of September 2009 was 15%, the highest in the state, compared with the lowest, Hoboken, at 6.3%, and a statewide rate of 9.8%. By 2018, the city's unemployment rate was 4.5%, compared to a rate of 3.9% in Hudson County.

Government

Local government

Union City's City Hall is located at 3715 Palisade Avenue. The oldest municipal building in North Hudson, it was built in the 1890s as the town hall for Union Hill. Prior to the 1914 opening of Union Hill High School, classes were also held in the building. After the 1925 consolidation of West Hoboken and Union Hill into Union City, the town hall for the former was converted into the new fire headquarters for the city. It also served as the second police precinct for many years.

The governing body is comprised of a five-member Board of Commissioners, as per the city's Walsh Act form of government, which has been in place since 1930. The members of the commission are elected at-large on a non-partisan basis in the May municipal election. At a reorganization meeting held after the election, each commissioner is assigned a department to oversee. The mayor of Union City also serves as a commissioner. The city is one of 30 municipalities (of the 564) statewide that use this form.

, the mayor of Union City is Brian P. Stack, who became mayor in 2000 after a recall election forced the resignation of then-mayor Raúl "Rudy" Garcia. The five members of the Union City Board of Commissioners serve in both administrative and legislative capacities, with each commissioner acting as the director of one of the five major departments of the city, administering the daily operations of a designated department. The five commissioners and their departmental assignments are 
Mayor Brian P. Stack (Commissioner of Public Safety), 
Lucio P. Fernandez (Commissioner of Public Affairs),
Wendy A. Grullon (Commissioner of Public Works),
Maryury A. Martinetti (Commissioner of Revenue and Finance) and 
Celin J. Valdivia (Commissioner of Parks and Public Property), all serving concurrent terms ending on May 15, 2026.

The budget adopted by the city in 2021 was $151 million, which remained balanced during the COVID-19 pandemic.

Federal, state, and county representation
Union City is located in the 8th Congressional District and is part of New Jersey's 33rd state legislative district.

 

Hudson County Board of Chosen Freeholders District 6 is represented by Tilo Rivas.

Political demographics
As of March 2011, there were a total of 28,503 registered voters in Union City, of which 18,589 (65.2%) were registered as Democrats, 1,839 (6.5%) were registered as Republicans and 8,062 (28.3%) were registered as Unaffiliated. There were 13 voters registered to other parties.

In the 2012 presidential election, Democrat Barack Obama received 82.1% of the vote (14,569 cast), ahead of Republican Mitt Romney with 17.2% (3,050 votes), and other candidates with 0.8% (134 votes), among the 17,893 ballots cast by the city's 30,841 registered voters (140 ballots were spoiled), for a turnout of 58.0%. In the 2008 presidential election, Democrat Barack Obama received 74.6% of the vote (13,657 cast), ahead of Republican John McCain with 23.9% (4,366 votes) and other candidates with 0.8% (150 votes), among the 18,305 ballots cast by the city's 32,030 registered voters, for a turnout of 57.1%. In the 2004 presidential election, Democrat John Kerry received 64.8% of the vote here (10,894 ballots cast), outpolling Republican George W. Bush with 32.0% (5,375 votes) and other candidates with 0.3% (90 votes), among the 16,811 ballots cast by the city's 27,727 registered voters, for a turnout percentage of 60.6.

In the 2013 gubernatorial election, Republican Chris Christie received 58.1% of the vote (6,653 cast), ahead of Democrat Barbara Buono with 40.6% (4,651 votes), and other candidates with 1.3% (148 votes), among the 12,583 ballots cast by the city's 31,515 registered voters (1,131 ballots were spoiled), for a turnout of 39.9%. In the 2009 gubernatorial election, Democrat Jon Corzine received 76.8% of the vote here (8,611 ballots cast), ahead of Republican Chris Christie with 20.2% (2,265 votes), Independent Chris Daggett with 1.4% (152 votes) and other candidates with 0.8% (89 votes), among the 11,218 ballots cast by the city's 27,373 registered voters, yielding a 41.0% turnout.

Public safety
The Union City Police Department consists of over 200 officers. Union City's Chief of Police is Nichelle Luster, the city's first female Police Chief, who replaced former Chief Richard Molinari. Luster had been a captain since 2013, when she became the first female to attain that position. 

Until 1999, the Union City Fire Department consisted of 100 firefighters, and four fire stations. In January 1999 Union City and four other cities in North Hudson merged their fire departments into North Hudson Regional Fire and Rescue. The other municipalities include Guttenberg, North Bergen, Weehawken and West New York. Three of the NHRFR's fire stations are located in Union City:

 Battalion 1 / Squad 2 / Ladder 1 – 1600 New York Avenue
 Deputy 1 / Engine 4 – 541–29th Street
 Battalion 2 / Rescue 1 / Squad 1 – 4300 Kennedy Boulevard

Transportation

Roads and highways

Several major roadways traverse Union City. New Jersey Route 495 is the most significant highway passing through, connecting directly to the Lincoln Tunnel into New York City. To the west, it connects with, Interstate 95 (the New Jersey Turnpike), U.S. Route 1/9 and New Jersey Route 3. County Route 505 also passes through the city. Within the city, Bergenline Avenue and the marginal highway of Route 495 are major public transportation corridors.

Public transportation

The Bergenline Avenue station of the Hudson-Bergen Light Rail is located at 49th Street near the city line with West New York and North Bergen.

New Jersey Transit bus service transportation is available to points in Hudson, Bergen, and Passaic counties and to the Port Authority Bus Terminal in Midtown Manhattan. Routes which stop in the city are the 111, 121, 123, 124, 125, 127, 129, 154, 156, 159, 144, 190 (and the 107, 108, 160, 161, 163, 167, 191, 192 by passenger request for travel to the Port Authority Bus Terminal only), and the 195 (Saturdays only). The George Washington Bridge Bus Terminal is served by the 181. Jersey City can be reached on the 22, 82, 83, 84, 85, 86, 88 and 89 routes.

OurBus routes link Union City to Washington, D.C.

Additional public transportation service is augmented by privately operated dollar vans that link Union City to various points throughout the New York metropolitan area, such as the Hudson County Courthouse, Newport Mall, 42nd Street in Manhattan, and Paterson, New Jersey. The minibuses, locally known by their Spanish language name guagua, have come subject to greater scrutiny due to alleged safety issues.

In 2021, Union City was among the municipalities in Hudson County that formally codified regulations governing the use of electric bicycles and scooters.

John F. Kennedy Airport is also in Queens. The Colombian airline Avianca operates a private bus service from to Union City and Elizabeth for passengers on Avianca flights departing from and arriving to JFK.

Education

The student population was 9,730 as of November 2009. In 2021, its 14 public schools served 11,893 students. 

Historically, Union City schools have ranked among the highest in Hudson County in reported incidents of violence compared to the size of the student population more than once, most recently in a November 2009 report by the New Jersey Department of Education, which annually records incidents of violence, vandalism, weapons and substance abuse or possession. According to the report, such incidents declined statewide between the 2006–2007 and the 2007–2008 school years, but rose slightly in Hudson County, with Union City schools having the second-highest number of reported incidents behind the Jersey City Public Schools.

University of California, Berkeley Professor David L. Kirp, in his 2011 book, Kids First, and his 2013 book, Improbable Scholars, praised Union City's education system for bringing poor, mostly immigrant kids (three quarters of whom live in homes where only Spanish is spoken and a quarter of which are thought to be undocumented and fearful of deportation) into the educational mainstream. Kirp, who spent a year in Union City examining its schools, notes that while in the late 1970s, Union City schools faced the threat of state takeover, they now boast achievement scores that approximate the statewide average. Kirp also observes that in 2011, Union City boasted a high school graduation rate of 89.5 percent—roughly 10 percentage points higher than the national average, and that in 2012, 75 percent of Union City graduates enrolled in college, with top students winning scholarships to the Ivy League. Kirp singles out the city's practice of enrolling almost every 3- and 4-year-old in kindergarten, and the leadership of Union City High School principal John Bennetti for the positive educational atmosphere in that school.

Public schools

The Union City School District operates public schools in Union City, serving students in pre-kindergarten through twelfth grade. The district is one of 31 former Abbott districts statewide that were established pursuant to the decision by the New Jersey Supreme Court in Abbott v. Burke which are now referred to as "SDA Districts" based on the requirement for the state to cover all costs for school building and renovation projects in these districts under the supervision of the New Jersey Schools Development Authority.

As of the 2018–19 school year, the district, comprised of 14 schools, had an enrollment of 13,768 students and 837.2 classroom teachers (on an FTE basis), for a student–teacher ratio of 16.4:1. Schools in the district (with 2018–19 enrollment data from the National Center for Education Statistics) are:
 Eugenio Maria de Hostos Center for Early Childhood Education (298; grades Pre-K–K)
 Thomas A. Edison Elementary School (1,019; Pre-K–6)
 Sara Gilmore Academy School (399; 1–8)
 Henry Hudson Elementary School (367; Pre-K–2)
 Jefferson Elementary School (329; Pre-K–4)
 Colin Powell Elementary School  (833; K–5)
 Theodore Roosevelt School (1,010; K–6)
 Veteran's Memorial Elementary School (606; Pre-K–5)
 George Washington Elementary School (796; Pre-K–6)
 Robert Waters Elementary School (1,084; Pre-K–6)
 Emerson Middle School (1,023; 6–8)
 Union Hill Middle School (885; 7–8) 
 José Martí STEM Academy (700; 9–12) 
 Union City High School (2,882; 9–12).

The city's single public high school, Union City High School, opened September 3, 2009, and was built on the site of the former Roosevelt Stadium. The $178 million school, whose signature feature is an athletic field on its second floor roof, replaced the former Emerson High School and Union Hill High School, which converted to middle schools.

The newest school to open in Union City is Colin Powell Elementary School, which opened in September 2012 and was dedicated on February 7, 2013. It is the seventh educational facility created over the course of a decade, and the 14th school in the city. For the 2013–2014 school year students from Gilmore and Hudson Schools were relocated to Colin Powell, so that the former schools, both of which are over 100 years old, could undergo renovations.

Woodrow Wilson School was awarded the Blue Ribbon School Award of Excellence by the United States Department of Education, the highest award an American school can receive, during the 2004–2005 school year. The Blue Ribbon School Award of Excellence was awarded again to Woodrow Wilson for the 2014–2015 school year.

Hudson County Community College's $28.1 million North Hudson Higher Education Center opened in September 2011. The seven story,  Center is located on Kennedy Boulevard, adjacent to the Bergenline Avenue Light Rail station. It incorporates green technology, such as photovoltaic electrical systems, rainwater harvesting tanks, daylight and occupancy sensors, low-flow fixtures, and high-efficiency mechanical equipment. The NHHEC also houses offices for the Hudson County Career Development Center and the County Clerk.

Private schools
St. Francis Academy is a K-8 Catholic school operated under the auspices of the Roman Catholic Archdiocese of Newark. In September 2013, St. Francis Academy was one of 15 schools in New Jersey to be recognized by the United States Department of Education as part of the National Blue Ribbon Schools Program, an award called the "most prestigious honor in the United States' education system" and which Education Secretary Arne Duncan described as honoring schools that "represent examples of educational excellence". In the wake of declining enrollment and lingering financial issues, Mother Seton Interparochial School (which had been formed in 2006 from the merger of St. Michael's and St. Anthony of Padua) and St. Augustine's School were closed by the Newark Archdiocese after the 2019-20, school year and merged into Academy of St. Joseph of the Palisades in West New York, New Jersey.

Other schools in Union City include two Islamic schools, Miftaahul Uloom Academy and Rising Star Academy, a Jewish school, Mesivta Sanz, and Union City Daycare Program School.

Notable landmarks

The former Monastery and Church of Saint Michael the Archangel on West Street, once the largest Roman Catholic church in Hudson County, is the one landmark on the National Register of Historic Places in Union City, and one of several locations which have been designated by New Jersey Register of Historic Places. It is now known as the Hudson Presbyterian Church. In 2002 José Martí Middle School and the southern branch of the Union City Public Library were built on the southern side of the Monastery grounds, on 18th Street. They opened in 2004. When Union City High School opened in September 2009, the middle school converted to José Martí Freshman Academy to house most of town's ninth graders. In 2019 that school converted again to José Martí STEM Academy, in order to expand the city's STEM instructon.

The Park Performing Arts Center was originally built in 1931 by the German congregation the Catholic parish of Holy Family Church (and still owned by the Roman Catholic Archdiocese of Newark) to house their cultural and educational programs Its outstanding feature is the Park Theater which seats 1,400. Incorporated in 1983 the non-profit arts center presents works of local, national, and international artists, as well as permanent and rotating exhibitions.

Union City High School and Athletic Complex opened in September 2009 on the site of the former Roosevelt Stadium, demolished in 2005 to make way for it. The sports field is located on the second floor roof of the building, which also houses the Union City Performing Arts Center and a community health center.

Emerson Middle School, was opened in April 1915 as West Hoboken High School, and was home to the Bulldogs. It was renamed Emerson High School for the writer Ralph Waldo Emerson, when the two towns merged. Located on New York Avenue at 18th Street, the original building is connected with the gym building, built in the 1980s, by a second story enclosed bridge that runs over New York Avenue. The school became the South campus of Union City High School in September 2008, before converting to a middle school in September 2009, with the opening of the new Union City High School proper. The mascot of Union City was also changed to the Soaring Eagles. Alumni of the school include DJ and music producer Erick Morillo and former Green Bay Packers center Frank Winters.

Union City is home to two Carnegie Libraries funded by the donations of steel magnate Andrew Carnegie. Both are considered historically and architecturally significant by the city. The first was built in 1903 by the Cranwell family builders, who were active in the construction of many of the city's buildings, with a $25,000 donation by Carnegie in what was once West Hoboken on 15th Street between Bergenline Avenue and New York Avenue. The second was built in 1905 at the corner of 43rd Street and New York Avenue in what was once Union Hill,  and is the main branch. The 15th Street library retains its original stained glass, but was closed in 2004 upon the completion of a new library on the corner of Summit Avenue and 18th Street, housed in the same building as José Martí Middle School. It was converted into the William V. Musto Cultural Center, which opened in June 2011. It houses the Union City Museum of Art, the Union City Police Museum, the Union City Art Gallery & Concert Hall, the Union City Museum of History, and a senior citizen center.

On June 4, 2004, nearly a year after the death of Cuban-American salsa singer Celia Cruz (who lived in nearby Fort Lee), Union City heralded its annual Cuban Day Parade by dedicating its new Celia Cruz Park (also known as Celia Cruz Plaza) at 31st Street and Bergenline Avenue, with Cruz's widower, Pedro Knight, present. The park featured a sidewalk star in Cruz's honor, and an 8' × 10' mural by Union City's Edgardo Davila, a collage of Cruz's career throughout the decades. There are four other similar dedications to Cruz around the world. The Latin American Kiwanis Club refurbished the park in early June 2006, replacing the mural with a backlit photograph of Cruz. Cruz's star has expanded into Union City's "Walk of Fame", as new marble stars are added each spring to honor Latin entertainment and media personalities. People so honored at the park include merengue singer Joseíto Mateo, salsa singer La India, Cuban musician Israel "Cachao" Lopez, Cuban tenor Beny Moré, Tito Puente, Spanish language television news anchor Rafael Pineda, salsa pioneer Johnny Pacheco, singer/bandleader Gilberto Santa Rosa and music promoter Ralph Mercado.

The city's first memorial to honor the five Union City citizens who died in the September 11, 2001, terrorist attacks was a sculpture placed in Doric Park, in whose courtyard citizens gathered on September 11, 2001 to view the attacks' aftermath. On September 11, 2007, the city dedicated its Liberty Plaza to commemorate the event. The Plaza, which serves as a transit hub through which commuters pass on their way to and from Manhattan, includes two memorial markers. Doric Park was later rebuilt as Firefighters Memorial Park, which opened in August 2009. The park includes a public swimming pool, and a new memorial to local fallen firefighters that stands at the entrance. Its popularity has attracted visitors from Manhattan and Staten Island.

The Monastery of the Perpetual Rosary, known as The Blue Chapel, was constructed between 1912 and 1914, as the first monastery dedicated to the recitation of the Perpetual Rosary in the United States. Although the monastery was well-maintained for many decades, after the number of resident nuns and finances dwindled, the chapel deteriorated and was vacated in mid-2009. Plans were announced later that year to renovate and expand the monastery in order to create housing units and underground parking, but negative public reaction squelched those plans. In 2010, the chapel was included on Preservation New Jersey's annual 10 Most Endangered Historic Sites list, which is intended to draw attention to historical sites in need of preservation. The site's caretakers have previously indicated that it will likely be abandoned or sold, but the city Board of Commissioners passed a November 3, 2010 resolution designating it as a historic site as part of efforts to protect it.

In 2009, Union City began installing a series of historical markers to commemorate the lives of its noteworthy natives. The first marker was dedicated to the memory of boxer Joe Jeanette on April 17, 2009, and placed at the corner of Summit Avenue and 27th Street on April 17, 2009, where Jeanette's former residence and gym once stood. The marker lies two blocks from a street, located between Summit Avenue and Kennedy Boulevard, that was named Jeanette Street in his honor. Present at the dedication ceremony was Jeanette's grandniece, Sabrina Jennette. Another historical marker was dedicated September 26, 2009 to Peter George Urban, a 10th degree karate grandmaster, writer and teacher who founded an American karate system, American Goju Do. Present at the dedication ceremony was Urban's daughter, Julia Urban-Kimmerly. On May 22, 2010 the city dedicated a marker to novelist and screenwriter Pietro di Donato, and placed at Bergenline Avenue and 31st Street, where di Donato once lived. That area was named Pietro di Donato Plaza in his honor. Present at the dedication ceremony was di Donato's son, Richard. The fourth marker was dedicated to painter William Tylee Ranney on September 18, 2010. In addition to those honoring people, subsequent markers were erected to honor particular sites. As of December 2012, the city had eight historic markers.

On March 25, 2022, the city dedicated its COVID-19 Victims Memorial in Ellsworth Park, which was constructed in tribute to the citizens who died and suffered as a result of the COVID-19 pandemic. A plaque on the forward side of the pedestal reads, "In memory of all those who perished from the COVID-19 Pandemic. You will always be in our hearts."

Media and culture
Union City is located within the New York media market, with most of its daily papers available for sale or delivery. Until its closing in 1991 the Hudson Dispatch, a morning daily newspaper that once had a circulation of 39,132, was based in Union City for 117 years. It later relaunched as a free bilingual weekly. Local, county, and regional news is covered by the daily Jersey Journal. The Union City Reporter was part of the Hudson Reporter group of local weeklies until that chain closed in January 2023. Other publications that cover local news include the River View Observer and El Especialito, which is as of 2016, is headquartered in Union City.

Among the films set or shot in the city are Union City (1980) (which was released in conjunction with the Blondie song "Union City Blue"), Out of the Darkness (1985), Bloodhounds of Broadway (1989), and Far from Heaven (2002). The low-budget film directed by former Guttenberg mayor Peter Lavilla, Oak Hill, features local institutions including Union City's Palisades Emergency Residence Corporation homeless shelter and a synagogue in North Bergen. The first segment of the April 12, 2013 episode of the American version of the reality television series Undercover Boss was filmed in Union City. In the segment, Tony Wells, the CMO for the home security provider ADT, visits Union City to pose as a new employee being trained by a local ADT dealer.

In the late 2000s, Union City, West New York, Weehawken and North Bergen came to be dubbed collectively as "NoHu", a North Hudson haven for local performing and fine artists, many of whom are immigrants from Latin America and other countries, in part due to lower housing costs compared to those in nearby art havens such as Hoboken, Jersey City and Manhattan. The Union City area is a major training ground for actors in the county. In September 2008, Union City held its first annual month-long Art Month, which originated with the September 2006 "Celebrate Art" show at St. John's Episcopal Church. Art Month includes events such as the Union City Arts and Crafts Festival, held the second week of every September. Group shows are also arranged by organizations such as La Ola, a group formed to help unite local artists, and Federación Mercantil, which provides support to artists in the form of bank loan assistance and help avoiding foreclosure, and puts on an annual show of work by Spanish-American painters. Another is the Union City Artists Collective, founded in 2007 by a group of artists and public officials that includes painter/sculptor Amado Mora, who was named Union City's first Art Curator, responsible for the Union City Art Gallery at City Hall. Locations in which artists reside or have put on tours or shows include the Yardley Building, a former Yardley of London soap factory on Palisade Avenue that overlooks Hoboken, and the old R.H. Simon Silk Mill on 39th Street, which has been dubbed the "Union Hill Arts Building". The Park Performing Arts Center is also a popular arts venue in the city, as it houses Hudson Theatre Works, a theatre company founded in 2011. It was also the first venue for the Park Players, an acting troupe founded in the early 1980s by local teacher Joseph Conklin, and formerly hosted the NoHu Visions show, and the annual two-day Multi-Arts Festival until 2010, when the latter moved to Union City High School, which houses the Union City Performing Arts Center.

In 2009 poet/musician Graciela Barreto was named Union City's first poet laureate. By April 2010 she was succeeded by Ben Figueroa. During the late 2000s the city also named a City Historian and organized a Historical Committee.

The 2010 independent gothic horror art film, Vampire in Union City, was filmed entirely in Union City, and was directed by entertainer and Union City Commissioner Lucio Fernandez. Produced by MeLu Films, it premiered on September 3, 2010 at the Summit Theater, marking the city's first movie premiere, and the 2010 Celebrate Art Month, which included art exhibits, jazz, dance and opera performances, a film festival, and the public release of Francisco Rivadeneira's book, Los Amos del Planeta, Tomo II.

On April 20, 2018, Union City's Performing Arts Center hosted the official premiere of Union City, U.S.A., a documentary on the city's history and culture. It was written, directed, and produced by Fernandez, who began research for the film in 2008 with city historian Gerard Karabin, conducting interviews with numerous past and current residents of the city. The film was edited by director of photography Mauro De Trizio, and narrated by Tom Colavito.

The Multi-Arts Festival is an exhibition of artwork, musical performances and workshops held every May since 1981. Students and alumni of the various schools of Union City display their artwork, put on musical performances, and put on free demonstrations of sculpture, portraiture and caricature for attendees. It was created by Agnes Dauerman, a Union Hill High School art teacher, who coordinated the program for 25 years before she retired in 2005. The Union City Museum of Art, the Union City Police Museum, the Union City Art Gallery and Concert Hall and the Union City Museum of History are housed in the William V. Musto Cultural Center, formerly the 15th Street library. The Musto Center hosts a number of events, including various concerts and theatrical performances. Specific events it has hosted include the Union City Artist Awards, the NoHu International Film Festival, and Artists Assemble!, a comics festival first held in February 2013.

The first annual Union City International Film Festival began in December 2010, with the short film X, which was written and directed by Josh Brolin, as the opening film. Later that month Union City unveiled the Union City Plaza of the Arts on Bergenline Avenue between 30th and 31st Streets, as a venue for artists to congregate and showcase their work. The location, which sees copious traffic to and from Midtown Manhattan, was chosen in order to showcase the city in a positive light to commuters, and so that the plaza could represent fine arts alongside the adjacent Pietro Di Donato Plaza and Celia Cruz Plaza, which represent literature and music, respectively.

On June 11, 2014, the city's Board of Commissioners passed a resolution adopting "Union City" as the city's official song. The song was composed by Union City native Phil Gallo and Weehawken native Mike Boldt, and performed by the group Dez Manku, which features Boldt and Gallo. An accompanying music video was produced and edited by Mauro DeTrizio for Action Productions, and released on YouTube and iTunes. The guitar-driven rock song's lyrics make references to local streets such as Bergenline Avenue and Monastery Place, and landmarks such as the Roosevelt Theater, the Hudson Burlesque, and the former high schools, Emerson and Union Hill.

Notable people

See also

Notes

References
 Ryman, Ella-May. History of West Hoboken and Union Hill (1965)
 Primont, Daniel A.; Fiedler, William G.; and Zuccaro, Fred.
 The City of Union City (A 1996 calendar)

External links

 Union City's official website
 Union City Board of Education
 
 Data for the Union City Board of Education, National Center for Education Statistics
 Park Performing Arts Center

 
1925 establishments in New Jersey
Cities in Hudson County, New Jersey
New Jersey Urban Enterprise Zones
North Hudson, New Jersey
Populated places established in 1925
Walsh Act
Embroidery in the United States